Whiteleg shrimp (Litopenaeus vannamei, synonym Penaeus vannamei), also known as Pacific white shrimp or King prawn, is a species of prawn of the eastern Pacific Ocean commonly caught or farmed for food.

Description
The rostrum is moderately long, with 7–10 teeth on the dorsal side and two to four teeth on the ventral side.

Distribution and habitat
Whiteleg shrimp are native to the eastern Pacific Ocean, from the Mexican state of Sonora  to as far south as northern Peru. It is restricted to areas where the water temperatures remain above  throughout the year.

Fishery and aquaculture
During the 20th century, L. vannamei was an important species for Mexican inshore fishermen, as well as for trawlers further offshore.
In the late 20th century, the wild fishery was overtaken by the development of aquaculture production; this began in 1973 in Florida using prawns captured in Panama, that were used in hatcheries for larvae production.

In Latin America, the culture of L. vannamei started to develop with the availability of hatchery larvae, the development of feeds, the technification of the growth processes, the freezing installations and market channels, among others.

From Mexico to Peru most countries developed in the 70s and 80s large production areas.
Ecuador became one of the world leaders producers of this type of shrimp.

Around the beginning of the millennium, Asia introduced this species in their aquaculture operations (changing from Penaeus monodon).
China, Vietnam, India and others have become major packers as well.

The packing of shrimp from aquaculture origin has overpassed the quantity of ocean caught wild shrimp in recent years. 
Both origins, ocean caught and aquaculture, are subject to weather changes and diseases.

By 2004, global production of L. vannamei approached 1,116,000 t, and exceeded that of Penaeus monodon.

L. vannamei have been cultivated indoors through a recirculating aquaculture systems at TransparentSea Farm, a startup in Downey, California.

Weather effect
Normally, there are peaks of production during the warm El Niño years, and reduced production during the cooler La Niña years. The effect is on ocean caught as well as on aquaculture origin.

Diseases
There are several known diseases. Production of L. vannamei is limited by its susceptibility to white spot syndrome, Taura syndrome, infectious hypodermal and haematopoietic necrosis, baculoviral midgut gland necrosis, and Vibrio infections.

Impact on nature
In 2010, Greenpeace International added the whiteleg shrimp to its seafood red list.
This lists fish that are commonly sold in supermarkets around the world, and which have a very high risk of being sourced from unsustainable fisheries. The reasons given by Greenpeace were "destruction of vast areas of mangroves in several countries, overfishing of juvenile shrimp from the wild to supply shrimp farms, and significant human rights abuses". In 2016, L. vannamei accounted for 53% of the total production of farmed crustaceans globally.

See also
Macrobrachium rosenbergii, the giant freshwater prawn
Pandalus borealis, Canadian northern prawns

References

External links

Thailand's White Shrimp Revolution

Penaeidae
Edible crustaceans
Commercial crustaceans
Crustaceans of the eastern Pacific Ocean
Crustaceans described in 1931